Can is a common Turkish, Azerbaijani and Circassian given name and surname, meaning spirit, life, soul or heart. Turkish and Azerbaijani use is derived from the Persian word Jan (Persian: جان) and Circassian use is derived from Circassian word Janberk. In Turkish, the name Can is pronounced similarly to the common English name John. Džan Is a variant in use in Bosnia and Herzegovina.

Given name
Asım Can Gündüz (born 1955), Turkish rock and blues guitarist
Bahtiyar Can Vanlı (born 1962), German-Turkish football coach
Can Akın (born 1983), Turkish basketball player
Can Arat (born 1984), Turkish footballer
Can Artam (born 1981), Turkish race car driver
Can Atilla (born 1969), Turkish composer and musician
Can Ayvazoğlu (born 1979), Turkish volleyball player
Can Bartu (1936–2019), Turkish basketball player, footballer and columnist
Can Bonomo (born 1987), Turkish pop sin
Can Dündar (born 1961), Turkish journalist, columnist and documentarian
Can Emre Yücel (born 1983), Turkish footballer
Can Erdem (born 1987), Turkish footballer
Can Ergenekan (born 1972), Turkish-American swimmer
Can Kim Hua, Vietnamese-American professional poker player
Can Korkmaz (born 1992), Turkish basketball player
Can Maxim Mutaf (born 1991), Turkish basketball player
Can Öncü (born 2003), Turkish motorcycle racer
Can Themba (1924–68), South African short-story writer
Can Togay (born 1955), Hungarian film director
Can Yücel (1926–1999), Turkish poet
Can Yaman, Turkish actor
Cen Can (715–770), Chinese poet
Coşkun Can Aktan (born 1963), Turkish professor of economics
Çiğdem Can Rasna (born 1976), Turkish volleyball player
Ömer Can Sokullu (born 1988), Turkish footballer

Chinese and Vietnamese
Huy Cận (1919–2005), Vietnamese poet
Kun Can (1612 – after 1674), Chinese painter
Liu Can (died 318), emperor of the Chinese/Xiongnu state Han Zhao
Liu Can (Tang Dynasty) (died 906), official of the Chinese Tang Dynasty
Ngô Đình Cẩn (1911–64), member of South Vietnam's Diệm government
Nguyễn Bá Cẩn (1930–2009), former Prime Minister of South Vietnam
Trịnh Căn (1633–1709), Vietnamese ruler
Wang Can (177–217), politician, scholar and poet during Chinese Han Dynasty
Wu Can (died 245), official of Eastern Wu during the Chinese Three Kingdoms period
Yuan Can (420–477), high-level official of the Chinese dynasty Liu Song
Zhou Can (born 1979), Chinese long jumper
Zhu Can (died 621), rebel leader during the Chinese Sui Dynasty

Surname
Cem Can (born 1981), Turkish footballer
Cihan Can (born 1986), Turkish footballer
 Derya Can Göçen, Turkish world record holder female free-diver
Emre Can (born 1994), German footballer of Turkish origin
Emre Can (chess player) (born 1990), Turkish Grand Master chess player
Erdem Can (born 1980), Turkish basketball coach
Erkan Can (born 1958), Turkish film and theatre actor
Eyüp Can (boxer) (born 1964), Turkish boxer
Eyüp Can (journalist) (born 1973), Turkish journalist
Melisa Can (born 1984), U.S.-born Turkish female basketball player
Mustafa Can (born 1969), Swedish author and journalist of Kurdish origin
Müslüm Can (born 1975), German footballer of Turkish origin
Osman Can, Turkish jurist
Sibel Can (born 1970), Turkish folk pop singer
Şenol Can (born 1983), Turkish footballer
 Yasemin Can (born 1996), Turkish female long-distance runner of Kenyan origin

Cans
Joacim Cans (born 1970), member of the Swedish band HammerFall

Turkish-language surnames
Turkish masculine given names